Swift 3D is a computer software application program developed by Electric Rain that allows the user to export vector & raster 3d modes or import 3D models, animate or manipulate them, and export them for use in Adobe Flash. Swift 3D support DWG, WMF, EMF & SWF file and can be exported in SWF (Flash) files after basic animation.  animations.

Version 5 adds functionality to export to Papervision3D, an application for incorporating 3D into Flash.

References

External links
 Official website 

3D graphics software
Animation software